Jewar  Assembly constituency is one of the 403 constituencies of the Uttar Pradesh Legislative Assembly, India. It is a part of the Gautam Budh Nagar district and one of the five assembly constituencies in the Gautam Buddha Nagar Lok Sabha constituency. First election in this assembly constituency was held in 1957 after the "DPACO (1961)" (delimitation order) was passed in 1961. After the "Delimitation of Parliamentary and Assembly Constituencies Order, 2008" was passed in 2008, the constituency was assigned identification number 63.

From the 3rd to 15th Vidhan Sabha, this constituency was reserved for candidates from  scheduled caste community.

Wards / Areas
Extent of Jewar  Assembly constituency is Jewar Tehsil; Ranhera KCs Dankaur, Bilaspur, Bilaspur NP & Dankaur NP of Gautam Budh Nagar Tehsil.

Members of the Legislative Assembly

Election Results

2022 General Elections

2017 General Elections

2012 General Elections

See also
Gautam Buddha Nagar Lok Sabha constituency
Gautam Budh Nagar district
Sixteenth Legislative Assembly of Uttar Pradesh
Uttar Pradesh Legislative Assembly

References

External links
 

Assembly constituencies of Uttar Pradesh
Gautam Buddh Nagar district